The Boston Common and Public Garden are a pair of public parks in Boston, Massachusetts.   Boston Common, established 1634, is one of the oldest public spaces in the nation, and the adjacent Boston Public Garden is a more manicured garden space which was established in 1837 on marshland that was filled in.  The two were listed as a single entry on the National Register of Historic Places in 1972. In 1987, the two were listed on the National Register separately, and each was also designated as a National Historic Landmark. The Boston Common, located east of the Public Garden, is separated by Charles Street.

Please see the individual articles for Boston Common and Boston Public Garden for further information.

See also
National Register of Historic Places listings in northern Boston, Massachusetts

References

Historic districts in Suffolk County, Massachusetts
National Register of Historic Places in Boston
Historic districts on the National Register of Historic Places in Massachusetts
Boston Common
Boston Public Garden